American Gigolo is an American neo-noir crime drama television series developed by David Hollander. It is based on the 1980 film of the same name written and directed by Paul Schrader. The series stars Jon Bernthal as Julian Kaye, the protagonist of the original film, alongside Gretchen Mol, Lizzie Brocheré, Gabriel LaBelle, Leland Orser, and Rosie O'Donnell.

American Gigolo premiered on Showtime on September 11, 2022. In January 2023, the series was canceled after one season.

Premise
Julian Kaye is exonerated 15 years after being arrested for murder and struggling to find his footing in the modern-day Los Angeles sex industry. He seeks the truth about the frame that sent him to prison all those years ago, and hopes to reconnect with his one true love, Michelle.

Cast and characters

Main
 Jon Bernthal as Julian "Johnny" Kaye
 Gabriel LaBelle as young Julian "Johnny" Kaye / Colin Stratton
 Gretchen Mol as Michelle Stratton
 Lizzie Brocheré as Isabelle
 Harlow Happy Hexum as young Isabelle 
 Leland Orser as Richard Stratton
 Rosie O'Donnell as Det. Joan Sunday

Recurring
 Wayne Brady as Lorenzo
 Kondwani Phiri as young Lorenzo
 Alex Fernandez as Panish 
 Laura Liguori as Elizabeth Shannonhouse
 Sandrine Holt as Olga Desnain 
 Yolanda Ross as Lizzy
 Jay Washington as Luther

Guest
 Jay Alan Christianson as Kevin Finnegan

Episodes

Production

Development
A television adaptation of the 1980 film American Gigolo, written and directed by Paul Schrader and starring Richard Gere, was announced as being in development on October 29, 2014. Jerry Bruckheimer, a producer on the original film, was set to executive produce the potential series, with Paramount Television Studios serving as the production company. On November 2, 2016, it was announced that Showtime had set up the project for development, with Neil LaBute attached as writer. The project was subsequently ordered to pilot on March 11, 2020, after going through multiple different incarnations, with Ray Donovans David Hollander set to produce the series as well as write and direct the pilot.

On June 15, 2021, it was announced that Showtime had given the project a 10-episode series order, with Hollander set as showrunner. On April 23, 2022, it was announced that Hollander left the project after an on-set misconduct investigation. The series premiered on September 11, 2022. On January 30, 2023, Showtime canceled the series after one season.

Casting
After a casting search took place in early 2020, Jon Bernthal was cast as the lead alongside the pilot order announcement in March 2020. In November 2020, Gretchen Mol was cast in a lead role, with Rosie O'Donnell added in a starring role the following month. Lizzie Brocheré, Gabriel LaBelle, and Leland Orser joined the main cast in January 2021, with Wayne Brady set to star in a recurring capacity that same month.

Filming
Principal photography began on July 12, 2021, in Los Angeles. On April 27, 2022, it was reported that production have been shutdown for four days due to Hollander's dismissal and an actor being unavailable at the moment. On May 12, 2022, it was announced that production has been shutdown again for at least two weeks as David Bar Katz exited the series.

Reception 
The review aggregator website Rotten Tomatoes reported a 35% approval rating with an average rating of 5.2/10, based on 37 critic reviews. The website's critics consensus reads, "Wasting Jon Bernthal's considerable charms on a tedious murder mystery, this American Gigolo is more dud than stud." Metacritic, which uses a weighted average, assigned a score of 50 out of 100 based on 19 critics, indicating "mixed or average reviews".

References

External links
 
 

2020s American crime drama television series
2020s romantic drama television series
2022 American television series debuts
2022 American television series endings
American romantic drama television series
English-language television shows
Live action television shows based on films
Male prostitution in the arts
Prostitution in American television
Showtime (TV network) original programming
Television series by Paramount Television
Television series set in the 1980s
Television series set in the 2020s
Television shows about murder
Television shows filmed in Los Angeles
Television shows set in Los Angeles